Elections were held in  the National Capital Region (Metro Manila) for seats in the House of Representatives of the Philippines on May 10, 2010.

The candidate with the most votes won that district's seat for the 15th Congress of the Philippines.

Summary
*includes Partido Navoteño and Partido Magdiwang.**excludes joint KKK/Liberal Party ticket.

Caloocan

1st District
Oscar Malapitan is the incumbent.

2nd District
Mitzi Cajayon is the incumbent.

The result of the election is under protest in the House of Representatives Electoral Tribunal.

Las Piñas

Incumbent Cynthia Villar is in her third consecutive term and is ineligible for reelection; her son Mark is her party's nominee for the seat.

Makati

1st District
Incumbent Teodoro Locsin, Jr. is in his third consecutive term already and is ineligible for reelection; Makati councilor Monique Lagdameo is his party's nominee although his wife Maria Lourdes is the Liberal Party's nominee for the seat.

The result of the election is under protest in the House of Representatives Electoral Tribunal.

2nd District
Abigail Binay is the incumbent.

The result of the election is under protest in the House of Representatives Electoral Tribunal.

Malabon

Malabon will elect their representative alone for the first time. Previously, they were a part of the Legislative district of Malabon-Navotas. Josephine Lacson-Noel is the last representative for the Malabon-Navotas district; she was seated after the House Electoral Tribunal ruled that she won the 2007 election over Alvin Sandoval after a recount.

Mandaluyong

Incumbent Neptali Gonzales II transferred from Lakas-Kampi-CMD to the Liberal Party and is running unopposed.

Manila

The Kapayapaan, Kaunlaran at Katarungan party headed by incumbent mayor and candidate Alfredo Lim is in coalition with the Liberal Party, although candidate and former mayor Lito Atienza's certificate of candidacy states that he is the Liberal Party's candidate for mayor. The COMELEC eventually classified Atienza as an independent.

1st District
Incumbent Benjamin Asilo is also co-nominated by the KKK. Arlene Koa is co-nominated by Asenso Manileño. Former representative Ernesto Nieva, who was supposed to run again under Lakas-Kampi-CMD, died on February 16, 2010, due to cardiac arrest. His daughter Mina was designated as a candidate by substitution.

2nd District
Jaime Lopez of Lakas Kampi CMD is the incumbent, but he is ineligible for re-election since he is on his third consecutive term already. His party didn't nominate anyone in this district; his son Carlo is co-nominated by the Liberal Party and the KKK.

3rd District
Zenaida Angping is the incumbent.

4th District
Trisha Bonoan-David is the incumbent.

5th District
Despite under Atienza's Buhayin ang Maynila ticket, which is supported by the Joseph Estrada-led Pwersa ng Masang Pilipino, incumbent Amado Bagatsing is the nominee of both Lakas-Kampi-CMD and local party Kabalikat ng Bayan sa Kaunlaran (KABAKA). Rep. Bagatsing later joined the Liberal Party but he is under Lakas-Kampi-CMD at the time of election.

6th District
Despite under Atienza's Buhayin ang MayniLA ticket, which is supported by the Joseph Estrada-led Pwersa ng Masang Pilipino, incumbent Benny M. Abante is Lakas-Kampi-CMD's nominee in the district.

Danilo Lacuna is also co-nominated by  Asenso Manileño.

The result of the election is under protest in the House of Representatives Electoral Tribunal.

Marikina

1st District

Marcelino Teodoro is the incumbent; he was originally a Liberal, but ran as an independent, then returned to the Liberals after election.

2nd District

Incumbent Del R. De Guzman is in his third consecutive term already; Miro Quimbo was nominated by his party to run for the district's seat.

Muntinlupa

Incumbent Ruffy Biazon is in his third consecutive term already and is ineligible for reelection; he will run for the Senate while his father outgoing senator Rodolfo Biazon, is his party's nominee for the district's seat.

Navotas

Navotas will elect their first representative alone for the first time. Previously, they were a part of the Legislative district of Malabon-Navotas. Josephine Lacson-Noel is the last representative for the Malabon-Navotas district; she was seated after the House Electoral Tribunal ruled that she won the 2007 election over Alvin Sandoval after a recount.

Outgoing Navotas mayor Toby Tiangco, who has served for three consecutive terms already as mayor and is ineligible for reelection, is running unopposed for the city's at-large congressional seat. His brother John Reyland will run for the mayorship unopposed. The Tiangcos are running under Partido Navoteño (Navotas Party) which is a local affiliate of Nationalist People's Coalition (PMP).

Parañaque

1st District
Incumbent Eduardo Zialcita is on his third consecutive term already and is ineligible for reelection; the Nacionalista Party did not name a nominee to run in this district.

The result of the election is under protest in the House of Representatives Electoral Tribunal.

2nd District
Incumbent Roilo Golez transferred from independent to the Liberal Party.

Pasay

Jose Antonio Roxas is the incumbent.

Pasig

Roman Romulo is the incumbent.

Quezon City

1st District

Vincent "Bingbong" Crisologo is the incumbent. He is running against Vivienne Tan, daughter of business tycoon Lucio Tan as an independent. Tan was disqualified on April 23, 2010, by the Court of Appeals for not being a Filipino citizen however the ruling is not yet finalized pending appeal.

The result of the election is under protest in the House of Representatives Electoral Tribunal.

2nd District

Incumbent Mary Ann Susano is running for mayor of Quezon City.

3rd District
Matias Defensor, Jr. is the incumbent.

Defensor placed the result of the election under protest in the House of Representatives Electoral Tribunal.

4th District

Incumbent Nanette Castelo-Daza is already in her third consecutive term and is ineligible for reelection.

San Juan

San Juan mayor JV Ejercito is running unopposed for the city's congressional seat. Incumbent congressman Ronaldo Zamora (Nacionalista) decided to retire from politics as he is ineligible for reelection. Ejercito is running under Partido Magdiwang. Partido Magdiwang is the local affiliate of the Pwersa ng Masang Pilipino, the party of his father, presidential candidate Joseph Estrada.

Taguig and Pateros

Taguig is divided into two districts: its first district also includes Pateros. Hence, the first district is called the "District of Taguig-Pateros" and the second district is the "District of Taguig."

1st District (Taguig/Pateros)

Former Councilor Arnel Cerafica is also nominated by local party Kilusang Diwa ng Taguig.

2nd District (Taguig)

Henry Dueñas Jr. is the incumbent but decided not to run in this election, while outgoing mayor Sigfrido Tiñga is also nominated by local party Kilusang Diwa ng Taguig.

On February 28, 2010, Angelito Reyes, son of Secretary of Energy Angelo Reyes, is declared the winner of the 2007 election by the House of Representatives Electoral Tribunal (HRET), with the HRET ruling that Reyes defeated Henry Duenas, Jr. by a margin of 57 votes; the Board of Canvassers originally declared Duenas the winner with 28,564 votes over Reyes' 27,107 for a margin of 1,457.

Valenzuela

1st District
Rexlon T. Gatchalian is the incumbent

2nd District
Magtanggol Gunigundo II is the incumbent

References

External links
Official website of the Commission on Elections

Metro Manila
2010